Meerane is a town in the Zwickau district of Saxony, Germany. It lies midway between the towns of Altenburg and Zwickau, west of Chemnitz.

As of 31 December 2015, there were 14,851 inhabitants. The population has declined from a peak of over 26,000 in the 1940s.

Meerane was once important for the manufacture of woollen and mixed cloths; associated industries such as dyeworks, tanneries and machine factories were also located there.

Population Development 

In 1546 there were 193 inhabitants, in 1583 120 property holders and in 1750 100 houses in the town and 159 houses in the vicinity.

Historical population (from 1960 on 31 December):

Data source from 1998: Statistisches Landesamt Sachsen

Attractions
 There are several parks: Wilhelm-Wunderlich Park, Annapark, Schillerpark
 The city hall was built in 1727, and has been completely restored
 The Lutheran church of St. Martinskirche was first documented in 1314

Twin town 
 Loerrach, Loerrach International Germany

People
Friedrich Eduard Bilz
Richard Hofmann, footballer, German international (25 matches with 24 goals)
Claudia Mahnke, operatic mezzo-soprano
Ingo Hertzsch, footballer

References

External links
  

Zwickau (district)